The Assadir dam is a dam in Saudi Arabia opened in 1982 and located in Al Baha region. The main purpose of the dam is irrigation.

See also 

 List of dams in Saudi Arabia

References 

Dams in Saudi Arabia